Essel Vision Productions is an Indian company which produces Indian soap operas , reality TV, comedy, game shows, entertainment and factual programming in several Indian languages.

Essel Vision is promoted by Subhash Chandra and is a private company. Its most successful works till date include Sa Re Ga Ma Pa and Dance India Dance.

Present shows

Past shows

 2012 Fear Files: Darr Ki Sacchi Tasvirein
 2018 Love Me India
 2013 Khelti Hai Zindagi Aankh Micholi 
 2014 Gangs of Haseepur 
 2014 Maharakshak: Aryan
 2020 Starika 
 2009 Dance India Dance (season 1)
 2010 Dance India Dance (season 2)
 2012 Dance India Dance (season 3)
 2014 Dance India Dance (season 4)
 2012 Dance India Dance Li'l Masters (season 1)
 2013 Dance India Dance Li'l Masters (season 2)
 2014 Dance India Dance Li'l Masters (season 3)
 1995 Sa Re Ga Ma
 1996 Sa Re Ga Ma
 1997 Sa Re Ga Ma 
 1999 Sa Re Ga Ma Pa
 2000 Sa Re Ga Ma Pa
 2005 Sa Re Ga Ma Pa Challenge 2005
 2006 Sa Re Ga Ma Pa Ek Main Aur Ek Tu
 2007 Sa Re Ga Ma Pa Challenge 2007
 2007 Sa Re Ga Ma Pa L'il Champs International
 2009 Sa Re Ga Ma Pa Challenge 2009
 2009 Sa Re Ga Ma Pa L'il Champs 2009
 2010 Sa Re Ga Ma Pa Singing Superstar
 2011 Sa Re Ga Ma Pa L'il Champs
 2012 Sa Re Ga Ma Pa 2012
 2021 Sa Re Ga Ma Pa Sapno Ki Shuruwaat
 2020 Sa Re Ga Ma Pa L'il Champs 2020
 2019 Gudiya Hamari Sabhi Pe Bhari
2019 Sa Re Ga Ma Pa Keralam
 2013 Dance India Dance Super Moms season 1
 2014 Sa Re Ga Ma Pa L'il Champs 2014-2015
 2015 Maharakshak Devi
 2015 Dance India Dance Super Moms season 2
 2019 Ishq Subhan Allah
2017 Yaaradi Nee Mohini (TV series)
2016 Lattu Nanga Hogaya
2019 Karunamoyee Rani Rashmoni
2019 Netaji (2019 TV series)
 2019 Dance India Dance 
 2018 Dance Kerala Dance
 2011 Classic Legends
2018 Main Bhi Ardhangini

References

External links
Official Website

Film production companies based in Mumbai
Television production companies of India
Indian  companies established in 1995
Essel Group
Zee Entertainment Enterprises
Producers who won the Best Children's Film National Film Award
1995 establishments in Maharashtra